Romeo and Juliet is a 2006 Canadian film made in Quebec, directed by Yves Desgagnés. It stars Thomas Lalonde as Roméo, Charlotte Aubin as Juliette, and Jeanne Moreau as Laurence. The movie has altered and modernized the Shakespeare play except for the last line.

Cast
Jeanne Moreau as Laurence
Thomas Lalonde as Roméo Lamontagne
Charlotte Aubin as Juliette Véronneau
Pierre Curzi as Paul Véronneau
Gilles Renaud as Réal Rex Lamontagne
Danny Gagné as Étienne Véronneau
Hubert Lemire as François Paré
Patrice Bélanger as Benoît
David Michael as Louki
Maude Guérin as Natacha Lamontagne
Liliana Komorowska as Mère de Juliette

Production
Charlotte Aubin was 14 at the time of the auditions and she had never kissed a boy. "I discovered things at the same time as my character," she said. She has some nudity in the shower, in a lake and in a love scene. "I'm not super modest. And there was respect on the set," said Charlotte.

References

External links

Films based on Romeo and Juliet
2006 films
Canadian drama films
Quebec films
French-language Canadian films
2000s Canadian films